Singtam is a town which lies mostly in Gangtok District and partly in Pakyong District in the Indian state of Sikkim about  from the state capital Gangtok. The town lies on the banking of the rivers Teesta and Ranikhola, which join together just below the town. NH10 and NH510 meet in Singtam. The Indreni Bridge and Sherwani Bridge over the river Teesta are in the town. Singtam District Hospital, the district hospital of Pakyong District, lies at Golitar, Singtam.

Geography
It has an average elevation of 1396 feet. As the town lies on the bank of two rivers River Teesta and Ranikhola, so during Monsoon especially from June to September the volume of both the river increases heavily, as a result destruction is caused on the low lying areas of the town especially at Adarsh gaon and Jublee line part of the town.

Demographics
 India census, Singtam had a population of 5,868. Males constitute 56% of the population and females 44%. Singtam has an average literacy rate of 71%, higher than the national average of 59.5%: male literacy is 75%, and female literacy is 66%. In Singtam, 12% of the population is under 6 years of age.

Transportation

Air
Druk Airways from Bagdogra operate to and from Bangkok and Paro. Bagdogra airport is connected to Gangtok by a helicopter service operating between Gangtok-Bagdogra-Gangtok.

Rail
They provide links to  all important cities in India.

Rangpo railway station is an under construction railway station which is 10 kilometres away from Singtam.

Road 
National highway NH10 (Formerly NH-31A) passes through Singtam and connects to the town to the rest of the nation. Long-distance buses ply from major towns in Bihar, West Bengal and other neighbouring states to Siliguri. From Siliguri, it takes about 3 hours to reach Singtam. Private taxis, shared taxi jeeps ply regularly on NH10. Government buses (SNT) and Privately operated buses are also available throughout the day. These transport options mostly operate between Siliguri-Gangtok/Singtam route. Jeep services are available between Gangtok/Singtam-New Jalpaiguri (NJP) and Gangtok/Singtam-Bagdogra route.

In Singtam NH-10 is joined by the following major roads:
 Chungthang-Mangan-Dikchu-Singtam Road
 Gyalshing-Legship-Tarku-Singtam Road(NH-510)
 Namchi-Damthang-Temi-Singtam Road
 Ravangla-Yangyang-Mangley-Singtam Road

Daily Taxi services access almost all cities and towns of Sikkim and cities/towns of West Bengal like Siliguri, Kalimpong,  Darjeeling, Kurseong, Jaigaon, Malbazar, Bagdogra, Panitanki etc.

Frequent buses operated by Sikkim Nationalised Transport (SNT) are available from Singtam to Sikkim Nationalised Transport Bus Terminus (Siliguri) and Gangtok, apart from it many private buses and NBSTC buses are available from the town to Gangtok, NJP Bus Stand and Tenzing Norgay Bus Terminus, (Siliguri).

Note: foreigners need a permit to enter Sikkim which they can easily get at Siliguri or at Rangpo, Sikkim.

Economy
Singtam is one of largest market towns in Sikkim and is easily accessible from almost all cities and towns of Sikkim.

The trade in large cardamom, the broom plant (kuccho) and ginger is important in Singtam's economy.

Attractions
 Indreni Bridge over River Teesta
 Sherwani Bridge over River Teesta
 Confluence point of River Teesta and Ranikhola.
 Balutar
 Bhanu Park.

See also
 Pakyong Airport
 Rangpo railway station
 River Teesta

References

Cities and towns in Gangtok district